San Andrés Xecul is a town, with a population of 15,074 (2018 census), and a municipality in the Totonicapán department of Guatemala.

References

Municipalities of the Totonicapán Department